This is a list of Interior Ministers of Denmark since the establishment of the Danish Ministry of the Interior in 1848. The Ministry was abolished in 2007 with most of the portfolio becoming part of a new Ministry of Welfare. It was reestablished in 2009.

List of Interior Ministers (1848–present)

Interior ministers under Frederick VII (1848–1863)

Interior ministers under Christian IX (1863–1906)

Interior ministers under Frederik VIII (1906–1912)

Interior ministers under Christian X (1912–1947)

Office is assumed by the permanent secretary.

Interior ministers under Frederik IX (1947–1972)

Interior ministers under Margrethe II (1972–present)

Notes
Frederik Tobiesen was often referred to by his nickname Frits Tobiesen.
From November 1918 to March 1920, Thorvald Stauning (Minister without Portfolio) assumed the Interior Minister's duties regarding the so-called Interior Ministry's Social Department Regarding Worker's Relations., but he was not awarded the title of minister.
On 29 August 1943, the Danish government resigned, refusing to grant further concessions to Nazi Germany. All government operations were assumed by the permanent secretaries of the individual departments, and this arrangement lasted until the Liberation of Denmark on 5 May 1945. Since King Christian X never accepted the resignation of the government, it existed de jure until a new cabinet was formed on 5 May 1945.
A total of three ministers died in office. Their successors were not appointed immediately.
Some tasks were transferred to the Ministry of Health in 1987.
The Ministry of Health was shut down in 2001, and some tasks transferred to the Ministry of the Interior, which were then renamed to the Ministry of the Interior and Health.

Sources
The Danish Ministry of the Interior. A history of the ministry
The Danish Ministry of the Interior. A list of ministers
Lists of Danish governments since 1848

Interior